The 1938–39 Texas Longhorns men's basketball team represented The University of Texas at Austin in intercollegiate basketball competition during the 1938–39 season. The Longhorns were led by third-year head coach and former Longhorn basketball consensus first-team All-American Jack Gray. The team finished the season with a 19–6 overall record and a 10–2 record in Southwest Conference play to win the SWC championship. Texas advanced to the inaugural postseason NCAA tournament, recording its first Elite Eight appearance.

Schedule and results

References 

Texas Longhorns men's basketball seasons
Texas
Texas
Texas Longhorns Basketball Team
Texas Longhorns Basketball Team